Since the 1980s, Italy has been a serious challenge contender for the America's Cup. Italian teams have won the Challenger Selection Series three times:  the Louis Vuitton Cup in 1992 with Il Moro di Venezia, in 2000 with Luna Rossa and the Prada Cup in 2021, again with Luna Rossa. 

Italy thus took on the official role of challenger and gained the right to challenge the defender in America's Cup.  However, it was defeated on all three occasions.

Italy in the Challenger Selection Series
Italy first participated in the 1983 Louis Vuitton Cup with the yacht Azzurra. Since then, at least one Italian syndicate has entered every edition of the challenger selection series (known as Louis Vuitton Cup from 1983 to 2013 and Prada Cup in 2021), except for the 1995 Louis Vuitton Cup. While Luna Rossa Challenge had originally entered the 2017 Louis Vuitton Cup, it withdrew in protest when the class of boats for the competition was changed without unanimous consent of all participants.

In three occasions, multiple Italian teams entered in the same year: two in the 1987 Louis Vuitton Cup, two in the 2003 Louis Vuitton Cup and three in the 2007 Louis Vuitton Cup.

Three Italian yachts ever won the challenger selection series, earning the right to challenge for the America's Cup: Il Moro di Venezia in 1992, Luna Rossa in 2000 and Luna Rossa again in 2021.

Italy in the America's Cup match
Three Italian yachts earned the right to challenge for the America's Cup: Il Moro di Venezia in 1992, the first team from a non-English speaking nation to do so, Luna Rossa in 2000 and Luna Rossa again in 2021. In all three occasions, the Italian teams lost to the defending champion.

See also
 Azzurra
 Il Moro Challenge
 Luna Rossa Challenge
 Mascalzone Latino
 +39 Challenge

References

External links
 Luna Rossa Challenge web site

Sailing